Gvozdansko is a village in the Sisak-Moslavina County, Croatia. It is connected by the D6 highway.

High above the village there is a ruined Gvozdansko Castle from 15th century.

Demographics
According to the 2011 census, the village of Gvozdansko 
has 42 inhabitants. This represents 23.20% of its pre-war population according to the 1991 census.

The 1991 census recorded that 68.51% of the village population were ethnic Serbs (124/181),  22.65% were ethnic Croats (41/181), 7.74% were Yugoslavs (14/181) and 1.10% were of other ethnic origin (2/181).

References

Banovina
Populated places in Sisak-Moslavina County
Serb communities in Croatia